Bárbara Navarro (born 9 April 1973) is a Spanish former professional tennis player.

Navarro began competing on the professional tour in the early 1990s and reached a career best singles ranking of 247 in the world. During this time she qualified for two WTA Tour main draws, the 1991 Brasil Open and 1992 Spanish Open. She featured in the qualifying draw for the 1992 Wimbledon Championships.

From 1996 to 1998, Navarro played collegiate tennis for the Baylor Bears and was named Big 12 Newcomer of the Year for 1997. Following her stint in the United States she returned to the tour.

ITF finals

Singles: 1 (1–0)

Doubles: 2 (1–1)

References

External links
 
 

1973 births
Living people
Spanish female tennis players
Baylor Bears women's tennis players